Hahm Eun-jung  (known mononymously as Eunjung), is a South Korean singer and actress. She is a member of girl group T-ara and its subgroup T-ara N4.

In 2017, Hahm became the first female idol to star in a thai movie with "Micro Love".

Film

Television series

Web series

Variety shows

Musical / Theatre

Hosting

Narrating

Music videos

Advertising

References 

South Korean filmographies